Mirza Nasir-ud-Din Muhammad (6 March 1508 – 27 January 1556), better known by his regnal name, Humāyūn;, was the second emperor of the Mughal Empire, who ruled over territory in what is now Eastern Afghanistan, Pakistan, Northern India, and Bangladesh from 1530 to 1540 and again from 1555 to 1556. Like his father, Babur, he lost his empire early but regained it with the aid of the Safavid dynasty of Persia, with additional territory. At the time of his death in 1556, the Mughal Empire spanned almost one million square kilometres. In December 1530, Humayun succeeded his father to the throne of Delhi as ruler of the Mughal territories in the Indian subcontinent. Humayun was an inexperienced ruler when he came to power, at the age of 22. His half-brother Kamran Mirza inherited Kabul and Kandahar, the northernmost parts of their father's empire. The two half-brothers would become bitter rivals.

Humayun lost Mughal territories to Sher Shah Suri, but regained them 15 years later with Safavid aid. His return from Persia was accompanied by a large retinue of Persian noblemen and signaled an important change in Mughal court culture. The Central Asian origins of the dynasty were largely overshadowed by the influences of Persian art, architecture, language, and literature. There are many stone carvings and thousands of Persian manuscripts in India dating from the time of Humayun. Subsequently, Humayun further expanded the Empire in a very short time, leaving a substantial legacy for his son, Akbar.

Background
Humayun was born as Nasir-ud-Din Muhammad to Babur's favourite wife Māham Begum on the Tuesday of 6th March 1508. According to Abu Fazal Allami, Māham was actually related to the noble family of Sultan Hussain Mirza of Khorasan. She was also related to Sheikh Ahmād Jan.

The decision of Babur to divide the territories of his empire between two of his sons was unusual in India, although it had been a common Central Asian practice since the time of Genghis Khan. Unlike most monarchies, which practiced primogeniture, the Timurids followed the example of Genghis and did not leave an entire kingdom to the eldest son. Although under that system only a Chingissid could claim sovereignty and Khanal authority, any male Chinggisid within a given sub-branch had an equal right to the throne (though the Timurids were not Chinggisid in their paternal ancestry). While Genghis Khan's Empire had been peacefully divided between his sons upon his death, almost every Chinggisid succession since had resulted in fratricide.

Timur himself had divided his territories among Pir Muhammad, Miran Shah, Khalil Sultan and Shah Rukh, which resulted in inter-family warfare. Upon Babur's death, Humayun's territories were the least secure. He had ruled only four years, and not all umarah (nobles) viewed Humayun as the rightful ruler. Indeed, earlier, when Babur had become ill, some of the nobles had tried to install his Brother-in-law, Mahdi Khwaja, as ruler. Although this attempt failed, it was a sign of problems to come.

Early reign

When Humayun came to the throne of the Mughal Empire, several of his brothers revolted against him. Another brother Khalil Mirza (1509–1530) supported Humayun but was assassinated. The Emperor commenced construction of a tomb for his brother in 1538, but this was not yet finished when he was forced to flee to Persia. Sher Shah destroyed the structure and no further work was done on it after Humayun's restoration.

Humayun had two major rivals for his lands: Sultan Bahadur of Gujarat to the southwest and Sher Shah Suri (Sher Khan) settled along the river Ganges in Bihar to the east. Humayun's first campaign was to confront Sher Shah Suri. Halfway through this offensive Humayun had to abandon it and concentrate on Gujarat, where a threat from Ahmed Shah had to be met. Humayun was victorious annexing Gujarat, Malwa, Champaner and the great fort of Mandu.

During the first five years of Humayun's reign, Bahadur and Sher Khan extended their rule, although Sultan Bahadur faced pressure in the east from sporadic conflicts with the Portuguese. While the Mughals had obtained firearms via the Ottoman Empire, Bahadur's Gujarat had acquired them through a series of contracts drawn up with the Portuguese, allowing the Portuguese to establish a strategic foothold in north western India.

In 1535 Humayun was made aware that the Sultan of Gujarat was planning an assault on the Mughal territories in Bayana with Portuguese aid. Humayun gathered an army and marched on Bahadur. Within a month he had captured the forts of Mandu and Champaner. However, instead of pressing his attack, Humayun ceased the campaign and consolidated his newly conquered territory. Sultan Bahadur, meanwhile escaped and took up refuge with the Portuguese. Like his father, Humayun was a frequent user of opium. In a popular revolt Bahadur Shah recaptured all of Gujarat in 1536 and began an attack on Malwa.

Sher Shah Suri

Shortly after Humayun had marched on Gujarat, Sher Shah Suri saw an opportunity to wrest control of Agra from the Mughals. He began to gather his army together hoping for a rapid and decisive siege of the Mughal capital. Upon hearing this alarming news, Humayun quickly marched his troops back to Agra allowing Bahadur to easily regain control of the territories Humayun had recently taken. In February 1537, however, Bahadur was killed when a botched plan to kidnap the Portuguese viceroy ended in a fire-fight that the Sultan lost.

Whilst Humayun succeeded in protecting Agra from Sher Shah, the second city of the Empire, Gaur the capital of the vilayat of Bengal, was sacked. Humayun's troops had been delayed while trying to take Chunar, a fort occupied by Sher Shah's son, in order to protect his troops from an attack from the rear. The stores of grain at Gauri, the largest in the empire, were emptied, and Humayun arrived to see corpses littering the roads. The vast wealth of Bengal was depleted and brought East, giving Sher Shah a substantial war chest.

Sher Shah withdrew to the east, but Humayun did not follow: instead he "shut himself up for a considerable time in his Harem, and indulged himself in every kind of luxury". Hindal, Humayun's 19-year-old brother, had agreed to aid him in this battle and protect the rear from attack, but he abandoned his position and withdrew to Agra, where he decreed himself acting emperor. When Humayun sent the grand Mufti, Sheikh Buhlul, to reason with him; the Sheikh was killed. Further provoking the rebellion, Hindal ordered that the Khutba, or sermon, in the main mosque be surrounded.

Humayun's other brother, Kamran Mirza, marched from his territories in the Punjab, ostensibly to aid Humayun. However, his return home had treacherous motives as he intended to stake a claim for Humayun's apparently collapsing empire. He brokered a deal with Hindal providing that his brother would cease all acts of disloyalty in return for a share in the new empire, which Kamran would create once Humayun was deposed.

In June 1539 Sher Shah met Humayun in the Battle of Chausa on the banks of the Ganges, near Buxar. This was to become an entrenched battle in which both sides spent a lot of time digging themselves into positions. The major part of the Mughal army, the artillery, was now immobile, and Humayun decided to engage in some diplomacy using Muhammad Aziz as ambassador. Humayun agreed to allow Sher Shah to rule over Bengal and Bihar, but only as provinces granted to him by his Emperor, Humayun, falling short of outright sovereignty. The two rulers also struck a bargain in order to save face: Humayun's troops would charge those of Sher Shah whose forces then retreat in feigned fear. Thus honour would, supposedly, be satisfied.

Once the Army of Humayun had made its charge and Sher Shah's troops made their agreed-upon retreat, the Mughal troops relaxed their defensive preparations and returned to their entrenchments without posting a proper guard. Observing the Mughals' vulnerability, Sher Shah reneged on his earlier agreement. That very night, his army approached the Mughal camp and finding the Mughal troops unprepared with a majority asleep, they advanced and killed most of them. The Emperor survived by swimming across the Ganges using an air-filled "water skin", and quietly returned to Agra. Humayun was assisted across the Ganges by Shams al-Din Muhammad.

In Agra

When Humayun returned to Agra, he found that all three of his brothers were present. Humayun once again not only pardoned his brothers for plotting against him, but even forgave Hindal for his outright betrayal. With his armies travelling at a leisurely pace, Sher Shah was gradually drawing closer and closer to Agra. This was a serious threat to the entire family, but Humayun and Kamran squabbled over how to proceed. Kamran withdrew after Humayun refused to make a quick attack on the approaching enemy, instead opting to build a larger army under his own name.

Humayun was soundly defeated. He retreated to Agra, pursued by Sher Shah, and thence through Delhi to Lahore. Sher Shah's founding of the short-lived Sur Empire, with its capital at Delhi, resulted in Humayun's exile for 15 years in the court of Shah Tahmasp I.

In Lahore
The four brothers were united in Lahore, but every day they were informed that Sher Shah was getting closer and closer. When he reached Sirhind, Humayun sent an ambassador carrying the message "I have left you the whole of Hindustan [i.e. the lands to the East of Punjab, comprising most of the Ganges Valley]. Leave Lahore alone, and let Sirhind be a boundary between you and me." Sher Shah, however, replied "I have left you Kabul. You should go there." Kabul was the capital of the empire of Humayun's brother Kamran, who was far from willing to hand over any of his territories to his brother. Instead, Kamran approached Sher Shah and proposed that he actually revolt against his brother and side with Sher Shah in return for most of the Punjab. Sher Shah dismissed his help, believing it not to be required, though word soon spread to Lahore about the treacherous proposal, and Humayun was urged to make an example of Kamran and kill him. Humayun refused, citing the last words of his father, Babur, "Do nothing against your brothers, even though they may deserve it."

Withdrawing further

Humayun decided it would be wise to withdraw still further. He and his army rode out through and across the Thar Desert, when the Hindu ruler Rao Maldeo Rathore allied with Sher Shah Suri against the Mughal Empire. In many accounts Humayun mentions how he and his pregnant wife had to trace their steps through the desert at the hottest time of year. Their rations were low, and they had little to eat; even drinking water was a major problem in the desert. When Hamida Bano's horse died, no one would lend the Queen (who was now eight months pregnant) a horse, so Humayun did so himself, resulting in him riding a camel for six kilometres (four miles), although Khaled Beg then offered him his mount. Humayun was later to describe this incident as the lowest point in his life. Humayun asked that his brothers join him as he fell back into Sindh. While the previously rebellious Hindal Mirza remained loyal and was ordered to join his brothers in Kandahar. Kamran Mirza and Askari Mirza instead decided to head to the relative peace of Kabul. This was to be a definitive schism in the family. Humayun headed for Sindh because he expected aid from the Emir of Sindh, Hussein Umrani, whom he had appointed and who owed him his allegiance. Also, his wife Hamida hailed from Sindh; she was the daughter of a prestigious pir family (a pir is an Islamic religious guide) of Persian heritage long settled in Sindh. En route to the Emir's court, Humayun had to break journey because his pregnant wife Hamida was unable to travel further. Humayun sought refuge with the Hindu ruler of the oasis town of Amarkot (now part of Sindh province).

Rana Prasad Rao of Amarkot duly welcomed Humayun into his home and sheltered the refugees for several months. Here, in the household of a Hindu Rajput nobleman, Humayun's wife Hamida Bano, daughter of a Sindhi family, gave birth to the future Emperor Akbar on 15 October 1542. The date of birth is well established because Humayun consulted his astronomer to utilise the astrolabe and check the location of the planets. The infant was the long-awaited heir-apparent to the 34-year-old Humayun and the answer of many prayers. Shortly after the birth, Humayun and his party left Amarkot for Sindh, leaving Akbar behind, who was not ready for the grueling journey ahead in his infancy. He was later adopted by Askari Mirza.

For a change, Humayun was not deceived in the character of the man on whom he has pinned his hopes. Emir Hussein Umrani, ruler of Sindh, welcomed Humayun's presence and was loyal to him, just as he had been loyal to Babur against the renegade Arghuns. While in Sindh, Humayun alongside Hussein Umrani, gathered horses and weapons and formed new alliances that helped regain lost territories. Until finally Humayun had gathered hundreds of Sindhi and Baloch tribesmen alongside his Mughals and then marched towards Kandahar and later Kabul, thousands more gathered by his side as Humayun continually declared himself the rightful Timurid heir of the first Mughal Emperor, Babur.

Retreat to Kabul

After Humayun set out from his expedition in Sindh, along with 300 camels (mostly wild) and 2000 loads of grain, he set off to join his brothers in Kandahar after crossing the Indus River on 11 July 1543 along with the ambition to regain the Mughal Empire and overthrow the Suri dynasty. Among the tribes that had sworn allegiance to Humayun were the Leghari, Magsi, Rind and many others.

In Kamran Mirza's territory, Hindal Mirza had been placed under house arrest in Kabul after refusing to have the Khutba recited in Kamran Mirza's name. His other brother, Askari Mirza, was now ordered to gather an army and march on Humayun. When Humayun received word of the approaching hostile army he decided against facing them, and instead sought refuge elsewhere. Akbar was left behind in camp close to Kandahar, as it was December, too cold and dangerous to include the 14-month-old toddler in the march through the mountains of the Hindu Kush. Askari Mirza took Akbar in, leaving the wives of Kamran and Askari Mirza to raise him. The Akbarnama specifies Kamran Mirza's wife, Sultan Begam.

Once again Humayun turned toward Kandahar where his brother Kamran Mirza was in power, but he received no help and had to seek refuge with the Shah of Persia

Refuge in Persia

Humayun fled to the refuge of the Safavid Empire in Persia, marching with 40 men, his wife Bega Begum, and her companion through mountains and valleys. Among other trials the Imperial party were forced to live on horse meat boiled in the soldiers' helmets. These indignities continued during the month it took them to reach Herat, however after their arrival they were reintroduced to the finer things in life. Upon entering the city his army was greeted with an armed escort, and they were treated to lavish food and clothing. They were given fine accommodations and the roads were cleared and cleaned before them. The Shah, Tahmasp I, unlike Humayun's own family, actually welcomed the Mughal, and treated him as a royal visitor. Here Humayun went sightseeing and was amazed at the Persian artwork and architecture he saw: much of this was the work of the Timurid Sultan Husayn Bayqarah and his ancestor, princess Gauhar Shad, thus he was able to admire the work of his relatives and ancestors at first hand.

The Mughal monarch was introduced to the work of the Persian miniaturists, and Kamaleddin Behzad had two of his pupils join Humayun in his court. Humayun was amazed at their work and asked if they would work for him if he were to regain the sovereignty of Hindustan: they agreed. With so much going on Humayun did not even meet Tahmasp until July, some six months after the former's arrival in Persia. After a lengthy journey from Herat the two met in Qazvin where a large feast and parties were held for the event. The meeting of the two emperors is depicted in a famous wall-painting in the Chehel Sotoun (Forty Columns) palace in Esfahan.

Tahmasp urged that Humayun convert from Sunni to Shia Islam in order to keep himself and several hundred followers alive. Although the Mughals initially disagreed to their conversion they knew that with this outward acceptance of Shi'ism, Tahmasp was eventually prepared to offer Humayun more substantial support. When Humayun's brother, Kamran Mirza, offered to cede Kandahar to the Persians in exchange for Humayun, dead or alive, Tahmasp refused. Instead he staged a celebration, with 300 tents, an imperial Persian carpet, 12 musical bands and "meat of all kinds". Here the Shah announced that all this, and 12,000 elite cavalry were Humayun's to lead an attack on Kamran. All that Tahmasp asked for was that, if Humayun's forces were victorious, Kandahar would be his.

Kandahar and onward

With this Persian Safavid aid Humayun took Kandahar from Askari Mirza after a two-week siege. He noted how the nobles who had served Askari Mirza quickly flocked to serve him, "in very truth the greater part of the inhabitants of the world are like a flock of sheep, wherever one goes the others immediately follow". Kandahar was, as agreed, given to the Shah of Persia who sent his infant son, Murad, as the viceroy. However, the baby soon died and Humayun thought himself strong enough to assume power.

Humayun now prepared to take Kabul, ruled by his brother Kamran Mirza. In the end, there was no actual siege. Kamran Mirza was detested as a leader and as Humayun's Persian army approached the city hundreds of the former's troops changed sides, flocking to join Humayun and swelling his ranks. Kamran Mirza absconded and began building an army outside the city. In November 1545, Hamida and Humayun were reunited with their son Akbar, and held a huge feast. They also held another feast in the child's honour when he was circumcised.

However, while Humayun had a larger army than Kamran Mirza and had the upper hand, on two occasions his poor military judgement allowed the latter to retake Kabul and Kandahar, forcing Humayun to mount further campaigns for their recapture. He might have been aided in this by his reputation for leniency towards the troops who had defended the cities against him, as opposed to Kamran Mirza, whose brief periods of possession were marked by atrocities against the inhabitants who, he supposed, had helped his brother.

His youngest brother, Hindal Mirza, formerly the most disloyal of his siblings, died fighting on his behalf. His brother Askari Mirza was shackled in chains at the behest of his nobles and aides. He was allowed go on Hajj, and died en route in the desert outside Damascus.

Humayun's other brother, Kamran Mirza, had repeatedly sought to have him killed. In 1552 Kamran Mirza attempted to make a pact with Islam Shah, Sher Shah's successor, but was apprehended by a Gakhar. The Gakhars were one of the minority of tribal groups who had consistently remained loyal to their oath to the Mughals. Sultan Adam of the Gakhars handed Kamran Mirza over to Humayun. Humayun, though inclined to forgive Kamran Mirza, was warned that allowing his brother's repeated acts of treachery to go unpunished could foment rebellion amongst his own supporters. So, instead of killing Kamran Mirza, Humayun had him blinded, thereby ending any claim by the latter to the throne. He then sent Kamran Mirza on Hajj, as he hoped to see his brother thereby absolved of his offences. However Kamran Mirza died close to Mecca in the Arabian Peninsula in 1557.

Restoration of the Mughal Empire

Sher Shah Suri had died in 1545; his son and successor Islam Shah died in 1554. These two deaths left the dynasty reeling and disintegrating. Three rivals for the throne all marched on Delhi, while in many cities leaders tried to stake a claim for independence. This was a perfect opportunity for the Mughals to march back to India.

The Mughal Emperor Humayun gathered a vast army and attempted the challenging task of retaking the throne in Delhi. Due to the Safavid role in Humayun's army, the vast majority of the army of the Shi'a faith, as one Shaikh Ahmad described to Humayun, "My king, I see the whole of your army are Rafizi...Everywhere the names of your soldiers are of this kind. I find they are all Yar Ali or Kashfi Ali or Haider Ali and I have, not found a single man bearing the names of the other Companions." Humayun placed the army under the leadership of Bairam Khan, a wise move given Humayun's own record of military ineptitude, and it turned out to be prescient as Bairam proved himself a great tactician. At the Battle of Sirhind on 22 June 1555, the armies of Sikandar Shah Suri were decisively defeated and the Mughal Empire was re-established in India.

Marriage relations with the Khanzadas
The Gazetteer of Ulwur states:

Bairam Khan led the army through the Punjab virtually unopposed. The fort of Rohtas, which was built in 1541–1543 by Sher Shah Suri to crush the Gakhars who were loyal to Humayun, was surrendered without a shot by a treacherous commander. The walls of the Rohtas Fort measure up to 12.5 meters in thickness and up to 18.28 meters in height. They extend for 4 km and feature 68 semi-circular bastions. Its sandstone gates, both massive and ornate, are thought to have exerted a profound influence on Mughal military architecture.

The only major battle faced by Humayun's armies was against Sikander Suri in Sirhind, where Bairam Khan employed a tactic whereby he engaged his enemy in open battle, but then retreated quickly in apparent fear. When the enemy followed after them they were surprised by entrenched defensive positions and were easily annihilated.

After Sirhind, most towns and villages chose to welcome the invading army as it made its way to the capital. On 23 July 1555, Humayun once again sat on Babur's throne in Delhi.

Ruling Kashmir

With all of Humayun's brothers now dead, there was no fear of another usurping his throne during his military campaigns. He was also now an established leader and could trust his generals. With this new-found strength Humayun embarked on a series of military campaigns aimed at extending his reign over areas in the east and west of the subcontinent. His sojourn in exile seems to have reduced his reliance on astrology, and his military leadership came to imitate the more effective methods that he had observed in Persia.

Character
Edward S. Holden writes; "He was uniformly kind and considerate to his dependents, devotedly attached to his son Akbar, to his friends, and to his turbulent brothers. The misfortunes of his reign arose in great part, from his failure to treat them with rigor." He further writes: "The very defects of his character, which render him less admirable as a successful ruler of nations, make us more fond of him as a man. His renown has suffered in that his reign came between the brilliant conquests of Babur and the beneficent statesmanship of Akbar; but he was not unworthy to be the son of the one and the father of the other." Stanley Lane-Poole writes in his book Medieval India: "His name meant the winner (Lucky/Conqueror), there is no king in the history to be named as wrong as Humayun", he was of a forgiving nature. He further writes, "He was in fact unfortunate ... Scarcely had he enjoyed his throne for six months in Delhi when he slipped down from the polished steps of his palace and died in his forty-ninth year (Jan. 24, 1556). If there was a possibility of falling, Humayun was not the man to miss it. He tumbled through his life and tumbled out of it."

Humayun ordered the crushing by elephant of an imam he mistakenly believed to be critical of his reign.

Death and legacy

On 24 January 1556, Humayun, with his arms full of books, was descending the staircase from his library Sher Mandal when the muezzin announced the Azaan (the call to prayer). It was his habit, wherever and whenever he heard the summons, to bow his knee in holy reverence. Trying to kneel, he caught his foot in his robe, slipped down several steps and hit his temple on a rugged stone edge. He died three days later. His body was laid to rest in Purana Quila initially, but, because of an attack by Hemu on Delhi and the capture of Purana Qila, Humayun's body was exhumed by the fleeing army and transferred to Kalanaur in Punjab where Akbar was crowned. After young Mughal emperor Akbar defeated and killed Hemu in the Second Battle of Panipat. Humayun's body was buried in  Humayun's Tomb in Delhi the first very grand garden tomb in Mughal architecture, setting the precedent later followed by the Taj Mahal and many other Indian monuments. It was commissioned by his favourite and devoted chief wife, Bega Begum.

Akbar later asked his paternal aunt, Gulbadan Begum, to write a biography of his father Humayun, the Humayun nameh (or Humayun-nama), and what she remembered of Babur.

The full title is Ahwal Humayun Padshah Jamah Kardom Gulbadan Begum bint Babur Padshah amma Akbar Padshah. She was only eight when Babur died, and was married at 17, and her work is in simple Persian style.

Unlike other Mughal royal biographies (the Zafarnama of Timur, Baburnama, and his own Akbarnama) no richly illustrated copy has survived, and the work is only known from a single battered and slightly incomplete manuscript, now in the British Library, that emerged in the 1860s.  Annette Beveridge published an English translation in 1901, and editions in English and Bengali have been published since 2000.

See also
Humayun (film)
Persian Inscriptions on Indian Monuments

Footnotes

References

Bibliography
; English translation only, as text

Cambridge History of India, Vol. III & IV, "Turks and Afghan" and "The Mughal Period". (Cambridge) 1928
William Irvine The Army of the Indian Moghuls. (London) 1902. (Last revised 1985)
Jos Gommans Mughal Warfare (London) 2002

External links

Accidental deaths from falls
Accidental deaths in India
Akbar
Mughal emperors
People from Kabul
1508 births
1556 deaths
16th-century Indian monarchs